Trabuco Oaks Steakhouse is a steakhouse located in the unincorporated community of Trabuco Canyon, California. The semi-casual restaurant serves steak and potatoes and liquor at its bar. Trabuco Oaks Steakhouse is famous for its no-tie policy; if a patron is wearing a tie at the restaurant, it is cut off and hung from the ceiling alongside many other ties.

History
Trabuco Oaks Steakhouse was founded by Eleanor, Duke, and Randy Sherod in 1968. It opened on June 28 of that year as a snack bar for campers staying at the nearby O'Neill Regional Park. Eventually, the decision was made to convert the snack bar into a dinner restaurant. In 1982, the Southern California Restaurant Writers dubbed the steakhouse "A Legend In Its Own Time," a phrase that was adopted as the slogan of the restaurant.

Former U.S. president and Orange County native Richard Nixon would frequent the restaurant. Inside the restaurant is a photo of co-founder Eleanor Sherod cutting off Nixon's tie.

Restaurant
Trabuco Oaks Steakhouse's primarily charcoal grills its T-bone, sirloin, and filet steaks, with dishes such as the two- pound Cowboy Steak to the eight-ounce filet mignot. Other selections include chicken, fish and vegetarian entrees, salads, baked beans, french fries as well as a selection of California wines. The restaurant is situated in a wooden shack-like building that was constructed around a large tree — its trunk is situated in the dining area. There is no electricity or gas in the restaurant.

References

Restaurants in Orange County, California
Steakhouses in the United States
Trabuco Canyon, California